Lark Hill Sports Complex is a multi-purpose sporting and recreation reserve at Lark Hill in Port Kennedy, Western Australia. It is located on 270 hectares of land approximately 60 km south of Perth, and is owned by the City of Rockingham. Stage one of the development costing $24 million was officially opened in 2008.

Facilities
Lark Hill currently provides sporting facilities for rugby union, rugby league, touch football, soccer, softball and cricket. There is also a synthetic field hockey pitch. The complex has lighting suitable for hosting night time events on all sporting fields, multiple changing room facilities, and grandstands for spectator sports events.

It was one of the home grounds for the Perth Spirit team in the National Rugby Championship in 2014.

The second development stage of Lark Hill, to expand the Australian rules football facilities, was dropped from the Rockingham City 10-year business plan.

Tenants
Sports groups with tenancies at the complex as of 2019 include: 
 Cricket: Rockingham-Mandurah Mariners District Cricket Club 
 Hockey: Rockingham Redbacks District Hockey Club
 Rugby league: Rockingham Coastal Sharks Rugby League Football Club
 Rugby union: Rockingham Rugby Union Football Club
 Soccer: Rockingham City Football Club
 Softball: Rockingham and Districts Softball Association

References

External links

Satellite Image of Lark Hill Sports Complex

Port Kennedy, Western Australia
Rugby league stadiums in Australia
Rugby union stadiums in Australia
Cricket grounds in Australia
Soccer venues in Perth, Western Australia
Softball venues in Australia
2008 establishments in Australia
Sports venues completed in 2008
Field hockey venues in Australia